The South African Railways Class 26 4-8-4 of 1981, popularly known as the Red Devil, is a 4-8-4 steam locomotive which was rebuilt from a Class 25NC locomotive by mechanical engineer David Wardale from England while in the employ of the South African Railways. The rebuilding took place at the Salt River Works in Cape Town and was based on the principles developed by Argentinian mechanical engineer L.D. Porta.

Origin
The original locomotive from which the Class 26 was rebuilt entered service in 1953 as the last of the Class 25NC 4-8-4 Northern type locomotives to be built. The Class 25 condensing and Class 25NC non-condensing locomotives were designed by the South African Railways (SAR) under the direction of L.C. Grubb, Chief Mechanical Engineer of the SAR from 1949 to 1954, and in conjunction with Henschel and Son. The first Class 25, no. 3451, most of the Class 25 condensing tenders and Class 25NC locomotives in the number range from 3412 to 3450 were built by Henschel, while Class 25NC locomotives in the number range from 3401 to 3411 and the other eighty-nine Class 25 condensing locomotives were built by the North British Locomotive Company in Glasgow, Scotland.

Class 19D trial rebuilding
The rebuilding project suffered from the outset from, at best, half-hearted support on the side of the SAR management who had by then already decided to replace all steam traction with electric and diesel-electric power.

Wardale, however, was determined to demonstrate that the efficiency of steam locomotives could be drastically increased by making use of a Gas Producer Combustion System (GPCS) to produce more steam for less fuel consumed, and the Lempor exhaust system developed by Argentinian mechanical engineer L.D. Porta to use steam with maximum efficiency.

As a trial run, Wardale was allowed to carry out extensive modifications on a Krupp-built Class 19D 4-8-2 Mountain type branchline locomotive, no. 2644. A GPCS and tandem dual Lempor exhausts were installed along with some other small improvements which included high mounted smoke deflectors.

The modifications enabled the locomotive to achieve significantly higher power and lower fuel consumption than other unmodified Class 19Ds, which resulted in Wardale being allowed to continue with the building of a Class 26 prototype.

Red Devil rebuilding
Work on Class 25NC no. 3450 began at the end of 1979. The manufacturing of all new items and modifications to existing parts were carried out at the SAR workshops at Salt River in Cape Town, Bloemfontein, Beaconsfield in Kimberley, Koedoespoort in Pretoria and Pietermaritzburg, the work being allocated to the workshop best suited to the particular task at hand.

Combustion
The primary objectives of the modifications were threefold.
 To improve the combustion and steaming rate.
 To reduce the emission of wasteful black smoke.
 To overcome the problem of clinkering.

This was achieved by the use of a single-stage gas producer, the GPCS, which relies on the gasification of coal on a low temperature firebed so that the gases are then fully burnt above the firebed. It  minimises the amount of air being drawn up through the firebed, the main source of air required for combustion being through ancillary air intakes located above the firebed.

The most serious waste of fuel in a conventional steam locomotive is the loss of unburned coal particles from the fuel bed because of the rapid flow of air through the grate. With the GPCS, the coal is therefore heated to drive off the volatile components which are then burned in the secondary air admitted above the grate. The result is improved combustion, thereby minimising black smoke, which is evidence of incomplete combustion with the result that unburnt coal particles are ejected through the exhaust.

Engine modifications
Amongst many minor detail improvements, other major modifications to the engine included the following:

 A lengthened smokebox to accommodate the tandem double Lempor exhausts.
 Offset double chimneys.
 A feedwater-heater between the chimneys.
 Improved lubrication on cylinder and valve liner rubbing surfaces.
 A booster for increased superheating.
 New piston valves.
 Articulated valve spindles.
 New cooled valve liners.
 Redesigned chromium cast iron rings and valve liners with streamlined cylinder ports.
 New cylinder liners.
 Altered valve gear.
 Herdner starting valves.
 Air sanding.
 An altered self-cleaning smokebox.
 Enlarged steam chests.
 Direct steam pipes.
 Improved pistons.
 Improved valve and piston rod packings.
 An improved variable stroke lubricator drive.
 Improved insulation.
 Improved Walschaerts valve gear with computer calculated dimensions.
 Continental European style high mounted exhaust deflectors, curved round but not parallel to the smokebox.

Tender modifications

Reclassification
These extensive modifications justified reclassification and the locomotive became the first and only Class 26, although its original Class 25NC number 3450 was retained. The Class 26 number plates, builder's plate and the Salt River rebuild plate which were attached to the cab sides at the time, have since been replaced with plates inscribed "Transnet National Collection".

The Henschel works plates which were mounted on the cab sides of 3450 were not the originals, but were taken off Class GMAM 4-8-2+2-8-4 Garratt no. 4068, Henschel works number 28697, which was withdrawn from service and stored at De Aar at about the time no. 3450 was being rebuilt to Class 26. The Red Devil's actual builder's works number, 28769, had the same digits, albeit in a different order.

Trials

Test runs

The locomotive was painted in a red livery and was officially named L.D. Porta after the Argentinian engineer responsible for some of the ideas and developments incorporated in its modification. Initial steaming and yard running took place on Thursday 5 February 1981 and the first test trip, running light from Salt River to Bellville and back, took place the following day. In subsequent Cape Town press reports the locomotive was dubbed the Red Devil. The nickname eventually became official and the locomotive now bears it on the Class 25NC type exhaust deflectors which later replaced the Continental European style exhaust deflectors.

Performance
Compared to an unmodified Class 25NC, the Red Devil achieved a 28% measured saving on coal and a 30% measured saving on water, measured during freight service, and a 43% increase in drawbar power based on the maximum recorded drawbar power. Its approximate maximum range in full-load freight service on 1% to 1¼% grades is  based on its coal capacity, and  based on its water capacity.

The drawbar figures were extremely conservatively calculated. Using both mechanical and electronic indicating equipment, the Class 26 recorded  on tests between Pretoria and Witbank, a world record for a narrow gauge locomotive. According to the dynamometer car, this was then developing 3,787 equivalent drawbar horsepower. However, the drawbar outputs were measured with less accuracy owing to the malfunctioning of the dynamometer car, which gave generally inconsistent results throughout the various tests made. The equivalent drawbar outputs were unacceptably low relative to the indicated ones  and gave an unrealistically high locomotive rolling resistance.

Drawback
The Red Devil's great power, however, also turned out to be its one weakness. The Class 25NC had already proven to be on the slippery side and the much more powerful Class 26, with essentially still the same dimensions as the Class 25NC, was even worse. It was a poor performer at starting or at low speeds on steep gradients. On its first working run from Pretoria to Witbank in Transvaal, a signal stop on a  gradient resulted in great struggles to restart, eventually causing about twenty minutes delay. Neither the Herdner valves nor the air sanding seemed able to overcome these problems.

Similar projects
In a sense, the outstanding success achieved with the South African Class 26 can be considered as the final spasms of a dying breed. Although it ended up as the most efficient and powerful steam locomotive on South African rails, electric and diesel-electric locomotives had already nearly completely replaced steam by the early 1980s and the project was halted with only the one prototype ever built.

Class 25NC no. 3454 B.I. Ebing

Following Wardale's departure from the SAR, the Beaconsfield shops carried out a minimal modification on an NBL-built ex Class 25 condenser, no. 3454 which had been converted to a free-exhausting non-condensing Class 25NC named B.I. Ebing.

Modifications on this locomotive consisted mainly of equipping it with a dual Lempor exhaust system and extending its smoke deflectors upwards and curved around the smokebox. In order to save the cost of extending the smokebox, the chimneys were installed side by side instead of in tandem like on the earlier Wardale locomotives. Apart from the blastpipe and chimneys, no other modifications were incorporated.

The modified no. 3454 was put to work in February 1985. Results, as reported by locomotive crews and shed staff, were noticeable savings in coal and water consumption when compared to a standard Class 25NC, although the amounts were never quantified. The locomotive was also noticeably more sure-footed than the Class 26, which tended to slip every time it started.

American Coal Enterprises 3000
Even though the Red Devil project proved that locomotives built according to the principles behind some of the modern designs for steam locomotives will outperform older technology steam locomotives by a large margin, it came too late to prevent the demise of steam rail traction in South Africa. Similar projects with the American Coal Enterprises 3000 (ACE 3000) in the United States in 1985 and later in China also failed to resurrect official interest in steam traction.

ACR Class NG G16A

In South Africa, two Class NG G16 narrow gauge Garratt locomotives of the Alfred County Railway were rebuilt in 1989 and 1990, using technology similar to that used by Wardale in the creation of the Red Devil. The rebuilding incorporated a gas producing combustion system (GPCS), Lempor exhausts, an improved spark arrester, lightweight multi-ring articulated piston valves, improved valve events and improved mechanical lubrication.

The rebuilding was done by mechanical engineer Phil Girdlestone, who was employed as Chief Mechanical Engineer of the ACR primarily for this purpose. The work was carried out at Port Shepstone, and the first locomotive to undergo the treatment was the Beyer, Peacock-built no. 141 in 1989. The modified no. 141 was also painted red and was consequently soon nicknamed the Red Dragon. The second locomotive, the Hunslet-Taylor-built no. 155, was rebuilt in 1990, but it retained its traditional ex-SAR black livery. Both modified locomotives were reclassified to Class NG G16A.

5AT Advanced Technology Steam Locomotive
The most recent such project was Wardale's proposed 5AT Advanced Technology Steam Locomotive in the United Kingdom in 2001, but the same factors which prevented further development of modern steam locomotives in South Africa, the United States and China were likely to also prevent the 5AT proposal from becoming reality.

Modifications
The main picture shows the Red Devil in Pretoria just over two months after the rebuilding was completed. Several modifications were done to it later, most of which Wardale considered to be actually detrimental to the performance of the locomotive. In the process the Red Devil was significantly changed to be more conventional by caretakers who did not fully agree with the basis of the recent conversion. Some of these modifications are externally visible when comparing the main picture with the later pictures below.

Preservation
The Red Devil last ran on a steam excursion on 23 September 2003 and was later mothballed, being cared for by private enthusiasts on behalf of the Transnet Heritage Foundation (THF) at Monument Station in Cape Town. As of November 2015, the locomotive had become the subject of contractual negotiations between the THF and the newly formed Ceres Rail Company, who wanted to put the locomotive back into service to haul weekend excursions between Cape Town and Robertson, Western Cape as part of its now reopened Ceres branch line project. On 13 July 2018, she undertook her first voyage in fifteen years. The agreement with the THF allows the locomotive to only operate during the South African winter months.

Illustration

References

External links

2090
2090
4-8-4 locomotives
2′D2′ h2 locomotives
SAR locomotives
Henschel locomotives
Cape gauge railway locomotives
Railway locomotives introduced in 1981
1981 in South Africa
Individual locomotives of South Africa